George Watson-Taylor (1771 – 6 Jun 1841), of Saul's River, Jamaica, was the fourth son of George Watson. From 1810 he was the husband of Anna Susana Taylor, the daughter of Jamaican planter Sir John Taylor, 1st Baronet, and heiress of her brother Sir Simon Richard Brissett Taylor, 2nd baronet. Suffixing his name with that of his wife's family, he would become the richest planter on Jamaica. He used the proceeds to purchase a house on Cavendish Square, Middlesex and Erlestoke Park, near Devizes, Wiltshire, becoming the Liberal MP for Devizes, an ardent campaigner for the retention of slavery, and a renowned fine art collector. Following the abolition of slavery his finances collapsed, and he died on 6 June 1841, in Edinburgh.

Early life and education
He was the fourth son of George Watson of Saul's River, Jamaica and was educated at Lincoln's Inn from 1788 and St. Mary Hall, Oxford from 1791.

Political career
He was a Member (MP) for Newport, Isle of Wight 15 April 1816 – 1818, Seaford 1818–1820, East Looe 1820 – 23 February 1826 and for Devizes 1 March 1826 – 1832. On arrival in the House of Commons he was immediately elected to the standing committee of the Society of West India Planters and Merchants.

He began his career as a member of the committee of West India planters and merchants, and opposed the abolition of slavery. When the slaves were emancipated in the 1830s, he received compensation to the tune of over £20,000 for over 1,000 slaves in Jamaica.

Other interests 
Watson-Taylor was elected a Fellow of the Royal Society in 1826.

In 1830 he arranged to have privately printed Pieces of Poetry: With Two Dramas, a collection of his short poems, some of them humorous or parodies of other works.

Marriage into the Taylor family
In 1810, Watson married Anna Susanna, daughter of Sir John Taylor, 1st Baronet of Lysson Hall, Jamaica, and thus gained considerable wealth from the Jamaican sugar cane plantations of Sir John's brother Simon Taylor (d.1813). He was granted the additional surname of Taylor by royal licence of 19 June 1815, following the death earlier that year of Sir Simon Richard Brissett Taylor, 2nd Baronet, whom his wife (as eldest niece) had succeeded.

The inheritance made George and his wife as wealthy as practically anyone outside of the Royal Family and the aristocracy. The couple bought a large landed estate in Wiltshire for £200,000, and a house in London which they renovated, the total cost coming to £68,000. This wealth allowed them to socialise with King William IV, and to host the future Queen Victoria.

Death
Despite inheriting great wealth from his wife's family, Watson was a spendthrift. He failed to live within his means, and by 1832 he was heavily in debt, and was compelled to auction off his personal property, having squandered much of the family fortune. He died in financial difficulties in Edinburgh in 1841, his estates at Erlestoke and in Jamaica having passed to his wife. His son Simon Watson-Taylor was also briefly a member of parliament for Devizes.

References

External links 

 Portrait (etching) of George Watson-Taylor, 1821 – British Museum
 Portraits of George Watson-Taylor – National Portrait Gallery

1771 births
1841 deaths
Members of the Parliament of the United Kingdom for English constituencies
Members of the Parliament of the United Kingdom for constituencies in Cornwall
UK MPs 1812–1818
UK MPs 1818–1820
UK MPs 1820–1826
UK MPs 1826–1830
UK MPs 1830–1831
UK MPs 1831–1832
Sugar plantation owners
Fellows of the Royal Society